Henry George Lynch-Staunton (5 November 1873 – 15 November 1941) was a British sport shooter who competed at the 1908 Summer Olympics.

In the 1908 Olympics he won a bronze medal in the team pistol event and was 13th in the individual pistol event.

References

External links
profile

1873 births
1941 deaths
British male sport shooters
Olympic shooters of Great Britain
Shooters at the 1908 Summer Olympics
Olympic bronze medallists for Great Britain
Olympic medalists in shooting
Medalists at the 1908 Summer Olympics
20th-century British people